Marvel Super Heroes Advanced Set is a role-playing game supplement published by TSR in 1986 for the Marvel Super Heroes role-playing game.

Contents
Marvel Super Heroes Advanced Set is a more complex version of the basic rules that can, however, stand alone. The "Universal Table" is still included, but it is more elaborate, allowing for a greater variety of results. Character creation includes detailed powers revised into 10 categories (Movement, Mental Powers, Energy Control, etc.). Combat is considerably more complex than in the Basic rules and includes magic and magical powers. Also includes numerous weapons and vehicles, more campaign info, 45 heroes, 28 villains, 9 "entities," character cards, and cardstock miniatures. A Judge's Book has been included in the Advanced Set along with a larger set of character stat cards, a new set of 3-D fold-up characters and a new map.

The set provides a new character generation system in which attributes can now take any value, and rank is determined by the range into which the score falls. The FEAT and combat systems have been expanded to give more types of action and better definitions of what characters can do and the results of doing it. Resources are now an attribute rather than a pool of points to be spent, and each power also has a rating to determine how strong it is an allow power FEATs. Negative popularity is now official. Area movement has been kept, but there is an alternative "ranged movement" system as well. There are some comprehensive tables detailing stats for weapons and vehicles and some rules for building an HQ. The Universal Table has been expanded at the upper end to include extremely powerful beings. All of the rules of the game are in the Players' Book, while the Judges' Book contains statistics for all the major Marvel characters re-done for the new system. The set comes with soft plastic dice and a wax crayon, card character sheets for the Marvel characters and card figures, and a map of New York.

Publication history
Marvel Super Heroes Advanced Set was written by Jeff Grubb, with art by Jeff Butler, and was published by TSR, Inc., in 1986 as a boxed set containing a 96-page book, a 64-page book, a cardstock booklet, a color map, and dice.

Reception
Pete Tamlyn reviewed Marvel Super Heroes Advanced Set for White Dwarf #84. Regarding the rules, Tamlyn states: "Jeff Grubb has done a pretty slick job, both in expanding the system without over-complicating it [...] and in explaining it all in an entertaining manner." He was critical of the set's complexity, "TSR seem to believe in simple, improvisational games for kids and complex, rule-heavy ones for adults." He continued, "Whether you need MSH Advanced depends on how you like to run your games. If you're starting out, provided it is not your first roleplaying game, I'd go for the Advanced game but be prepared to treat a lot of what it says as guidelines only."

Andrew Pearson reviewed Marvel Super Heroes: Advanced in Space Gamer/Fantasy Gamer No. 78. He rated the complexity as low, and the rules clarity and graphics quality as excellent. Pearson commented that "As other reviewers have said of the original, the advanced set has realism. The realism of this set is of the intensity one would have if he or she were actually living out a Marvel Comic. A more comprehensive listing of powers and talents is given in the new Player's Book. More exacting explanations of these features are given that can be compared to the realistic spell explanations in TSR's Advanced Dungeons & Dragons Player's Handbook. Contacts are now the replacement of Neighbors, Friends, etc. Of course this does not mean you cannot have neighbors or friends, it just means that you can have a larger amount of each. Contacts are those who can aid you in a gainful way during a campaign (i.e. support, information, equipment)." He added that "A major change is the deletion of Resource Points. It was figured that a large amount of Resource Points would be difficult to handle in numerous transactions. Replacing the points is a Resource FEAT which is rolled like other FEATs. Only one Resource FEAT may be rolled per game week and the roll signifies if such a cost purchase can be made. This limits the amount of large purchases a wealthy character may make, though. Very few other changes have been made to the rules in this set, so as to keep the simplicity in the game playing making it entertaining and exciting." Pearson commented that "The Judge's Book contains very little practical information, containing mostly combat information, but it does contain a set of character states for various Marvel characters like Wolverine, Doctor Doom, and the Kree. The character stat cards are like the original set, but there are more of them and they are more colorful." He noted that "The artwork of the Advanced Set is superb as it's done by the infamous Marvel Bullpen but it is sparse by a Marvel fan's standards." Pearson concluded his review by giving the product a 9 out of a possible 10 on the basis of "entertainment value, artwork, easy of playing and realism", stating that "The problem that keeps it from receiving a 10 is that the character stats in the Judge's Book are by no means complete. TSR has announced that it is releasing an Advances Set Marval Hand-book, a form of roleplaying version of the popular Handbook of the Marvel Universe series put out by Marvel, to solve the problem, though."

Shannon Appelcline commented that the Marvel Super Heroes Advanced Set helped to offset any complaints from roleplayers about the original game's simplicity.

Reviews
Fantasy Chronicles #3 (Sep 1986)
 Casus Belli #36 (Feb 1987)
Different Worlds #47 (Fall 1987)

References

Marvel Comics role-playing game supplements
Role-playing game supplements introduced in 1986